Dove Airlines was an Indian charter airline based in Kolkata.

History
The airline was founded in 2007 and began operations that April. The airline was  previously owned by Usha-Martin, but they divested their entire stake in the airline in 2015. Following the exit from the airline, the loss making Usha-Martin started gaining profits.

Fleet
As of July 2022, Dove Airlines does not have any operational aircraft:

References

Airlines of India
Airlines established in 2007
Companies based in Kolkata
2007 establishments in West Bengal
Indian companies established in 2007